Laredo Independent School District is a public school district based in Laredo in Webb County, Texas, United States. The district serves the south central portion of Laredo. In 2009, LISD was rated "academically acceptable" by the Texas Education Agency.

Schools

Elementary schools (grades PK–5) 
Alma A. Pierce Elementary School
Anita T. Dovalina Elementary School, named for the mother of former Laredo Community College President Ramon H. Dovalina
Antonio M. Bruni Elementary School
Christopher M. Mcdonnell Elementary School
Clarence L. Milton Elementary School
Demetrio D. Hachar Elementary School
Don Jose Gallego Elementary School
Francisco Farias Elementary School
Heights Elementary School
Henry B. Zachry Elementary School
Honore Ligarde Elementary School
Jesus A. Kawas Elementary School
John Z. Leyendecker Elementary School
Joseph C. Martin Elementary School
Katherine F. Tarver Elementary School
Leon Daiches Elementary School
Michael S. Ryan Elementary School
Santa Maria Elementary School
Santo Niño Elementary School
Tomas Sanches/Hermelinda Ochoa Elementary School

Middle schools (grades 6–8)
Dr. Joaquin G. Cigarroa Middle School
Louis J. Christen Middle School
Memorial Middle School
Mirabeau B. Lamar Middle School

High schools (grades 9–12) 
Dr. Leonides G. Cigarroa High School
Joseph W. Nixon High School
Laredo Early College High School at Texas A&M International University
Raymond & Tirza Martin High School

Magnet schools
Dr. Dennis D. Cantu Health Science Magnet School
Sabas Perez School for Engineering and Technology Education
Vidal M. Treviño School of Communications and Fine Arts, named for former Superintendent and State Representative Vidal M. Treviño

Other campuses
Francisco S. Lara Academy
Jose A. Valdez High School

References

External links

 

 
School districts in Webb County, Texas